The Chase Gardens Residential Grouping is a collection of five houses built during 1889-1945 located in Eugene, Oregon that are listed on the National Register of Historic Places.

See also
 National Register of Historic Places listings in Lane County, Oregon

References

1889 establishments in Oregon
Gothic Revival architecture in Oregon
Houses completed in 1889
Houses on the National Register of Historic Places in Eugene, Oregon
Queen Anne architecture in Oregon